Attaquin Beach is a beach at Mashpee and Wakeby Ponds in Mashpee, Massachusetts.

References

Beaches of Massachusetts
Landforms of Barnstable County, Massachusetts
Mashpee, Massachusetts
Tourist attractions in Barnstable County, Massachusetts